Pleurosicya bilobata, the bilobed ghost goby (also known as Seagrass Ghost Goby and Split-tongue Cling-goby), is a species of goby found in the Indo-Pacific from India to the Moluccas, and north to the Ryukyu Islands.

Size

References

Gobiidae
Taxa named by Frederik Petrus Koumans
Fish described in 1941